Dimas Manuel Marques Teixeira (born 16 February 1969), known simply as Dimas, is a Portuguese former footballer who played as a left back.

In a 15-year senior career he represented both Benfica and Sporting in his country, also having stints in four other nations, most notably with Juventus in Italy.

Having played nearly 45 times for Portugal, Dimas represented the nation in two European Championships.

Playing career
The son of Portuguese immigrants in South Africa, Dimas was born in Johannesburg, returning to Europe at an early age. He made his professional debuts in 1987 with Associação Académica de Coimbra, and stayed with the Students for a further two seasons in spite of their relegation to the second division.

Dimas then joined C.F. Estrela da Amadora, which had just won the Portuguese Cup. Thus, he made his European competition debut, helping the Lisbon club reach the second round of the 1990–91 edition of the UEFA Cup Winners' Cup and subsequently signing for Vitória de Guimarães.

After that, solid defensive performances earned him a move to S.L. Benfica for 1994–95, where Dimas continue to develop as a player, which led to a November 1996 transfer to Serie A side Juventus FC. He made 18 appearances in all competitions for the latter in the second half of the season, totalling 21 in the league during his first full campaign while being crowned champion in both years; however, he struggled to break into the first team permanently, and after only one match in 1998–99 he moved to Turkey on 1 October 1998 with Fenerbahçe SK.

In another winter transfer window, Dimas left Fenerbahçe in 2000 and played six months at Standard Liège. After a good run at UEFA Euro 2000 with Portugal (he made his first international appearance in 1995 while at Benfica, and was the nation's first choice at that and the previous continental competition, playing four games in each), he proved he could still be of value for a title contending team, and returned home after signing for Sporting CP.

After quickly losing the battle for first-choice with fellow international Rui Jorge, mainly due to a right knee injury, Dimas was deemed surplus to requirements, moving on loan to Olympique de Marseille although he still helped Sporting in two matches in his second season, as the capital club conquered the double. He retired at the age of 33, with 44 international caps and 202 Primeira Liga games to his credit.

Coaching career
On 16 February 2018, Dimas was appointed assistant coach at EFL Championship club Barnsley under his countryman José Morais. At the end of the season, which ended in relegation, the pair left Oakwell.

On 18 August 2018, Dimas and Morais joined Ukrainian Premier League side FC Karpaty Lviv. At the start of the following year, the pair took positions at Jeonbuk Hyundai Motors FC in South Korea, though he resigned in April 2019.

Style of play
Although he was neither the most skilful nor influential player, Dimas was known for his stamina, work-rate and ability to chase down opponents as a full-back, as well as his commitment and ability to make attacking runs down the left flank.

Career statistics

Club

Honours
Benfica
Taça de Portugal: 1995–96

Juventus
Serie A: 1996–97, 1997–98
Supercoppa Italiana: 1997; Runner-up 1998
UEFA Champions League runner-up: 1997–98

Standard Liège
Belgian Cup runner-up: 1999–2000

Sporting
Primeira Liga: 2001–02
Taça de Portugal: 2001–02

References

External links

1969 births
Living people
South African people of Portuguese descent
Citizens of Portugal through descent
Sportspeople from Johannesburg
Portuguese footballers
Association football defenders
Primeira Liga players
Liga Portugal 2 players
Associação Académica de Coimbra – O.A.F. players
C.F. Estrela da Amadora players
Vitória S.C. players
S.L. Benfica footballers
Sporting CP footballers
Serie A players
Juventus F.C. players
Süper Lig players
Fenerbahçe S.K. footballers
Belgian Pro League players
Standard Liège players
Ligue 1 players
Olympique de Marseille players
Portugal under-21 international footballers
Portugal international footballers
UEFA Euro 1996 players
UEFA Euro 2000 players
Portuguese expatriate footballers
Portuguese expatriate football managers
Expatriate footballers in Italy
Expatriate footballers in Turkey
Expatriate footballers in Belgium
Expatriate footballers in France
Expatriate football managers in Ukraine
Portuguese expatriate sportspeople in Italy
Portuguese expatriate sportspeople in Turkey
Portuguese expatriate sportspeople in Belgium
Portuguese expatriate sportspeople in France
Portuguese expatriate sportspeople in England
Portuguese expatriate sportspeople in Ukraine
Portuguese expatriate sportspeople in South Korea
Barnsley F.C. non-playing staff